The Te Wharau or Stony River is a river of the West Coast Region of New Zealand's South Island. It flows generally east from its sources in the Paparoa Range to reach the Inangahua River 15 kilometres north of Reefton.

See also
List of rivers of New Zealand
Hangatahua River

References

Rivers of the West Coast, New Zealand
Buller District
Rivers of New Zealand